James Stillingfleet (1674–1746) was the Dean of Worcester from 1726 until his death in 1746.

He was the son of Edward Stillingfleet, Bishop of Worcester from 1689 to 1699. Educated at Wadham College, Oxford, he was Rector of Hartlebury and became a canon of Worcester in 1698.

References

1674 births
1746 deaths
Alumni of Wadham College, Oxford
Deans of Worcester
Year of birth unknown